Right Of Way/Liberty station is a light rail stop on the Muni Metro J Church line, located in the Dolores Heights neighborhood of San Francisco, California. The stop, which opened with the line on August 11, 1917, is located on a short rail-only right of way that allows the line to avoid the steep hill on Church Street to the west. Due to the limited width of the right of way, the stop does not have platforms, trains stop in the middle of Liberty Street allowing passengers to step on or off trains. The stop is not accessible to people with disabilities.

In March 2014, Muni released details of the proposed implementation of their Transit Effectiveness Project (later rebranded MuniForward), which included a variety of stop changes for the J Church line. The stop at Liberty Street would be closed due to its proximity to the 20th Street and 21st Street stops. A more limited preliminary project announced in November 2019 will not close the stop due to the steep walk to nearby stops, but it may be closed later by the Rapid Project.

References

External links 

SFMTA – Right Of Way/Liberty St: inbound, outbound
SF Bay Transit (unofficial): Right Of Way/Liberty St

Muni Metro stations
Railway stations opened in 1917